The 3rd RedeX Trophy was a motor race, run to Formula One rules, held on 13 August 1955 at Snetterton Circuit, Norfolk. The race was run over 25 laps, and was won by American driver Harry Schell in a Vanwall. Maserati driver Stirling Moss was on pole position and set fastest lap.

This was the first Formula 1 win for the Vanwall marque.

Results

References 

RedeX
RedeX